Porters Lake Airport  is located  south of the community of Porters Lake, Nova Scotia, Canada. This aerodrome is located on privately owned land with lake frontage on Porters Lake, where the Porters Lake Water Aerodrome is also located.

References

External links
Page about this airport on COPA's Places to Fly airport directory

Registered aerodromes in Nova Scotia
Transport in Halifax, Nova Scotia